Delvin Myles (born 1972) is a former Canadian football and arena football wide receiver and defensive back. Myles was most recently active as the player-coach for the Alaska Wild in the Intense Football League.

High school years
Myles attended Bartlett High School in Anchorage, Alaska and was a student and a letterman in football. In football, he was an All-Conference selection and an All-State selection.

College career
Myles played college football at the College of the Desert and then transferred to Oklahoma State University.

Professional career
Myles played in the Canadian Football League for the Winnipeg Blue Bombers (1997–1998), in the Spring Football League for the Los Angeles Dragons (2000), in the Arena Football League for the Anaheim Piranhas (1997), the Portland Forest Dragons (1999), the Los Angeles Avengers (2000–2001), and the Oklahoma Wranglers (2002) and in the af2 for the  Bakersfield Blitz  (2003), Central Valley Coyotes and the Alaska Wild.

References

1972 births
Living people
American football wide receivers
American football defensive backs
Players of American football from Anchorage, Alaska
Oklahoma State Cowboys football players
American players of Canadian football
Winnipeg Blue Bombers players
Anaheim Piranhas players
Portland Forest Dragons players
Los Angeles Avengers players
Oklahoma Wranglers players
Bakersfield Blitz players
Alaska Wild players
College of the Desert Roadrunners football players